There are several species names which are called "triangulus"; "triangulus" is Latin referring to triangles.

 Triangulus (crustacean), a barnacle genus in the family Lernaeodiscidae
 Amblyseius triangulus (A. triangulus), a species of mite
 Amphithalamus triangulus (A. triangulus), a species of snail in the genus Amphithalamus
 Archastes triangulus (A. triangulus), a species of beetle in the genus Archastes
 Cybaeus triangulus (C. triangulus), a species of spider in the genus Cybaeus
 Heishanobaatar triangulus (H. triangulus), an extinct Cretaceous period mammal species
 Psechrus triangulus (P. triangulus), a species of spider in the family Psechridae
 Potamonautes triangulus (P. triangulus), a species of crab in the genus Potamonautes
 Praealticus triangulus (P. triangulus), a species of fish
 Tigriopus triangulus (T. triangulus), a species of crustacean
 Trachygamasus triangulus (T. triangulus), a species of snail in the genus Trachygamasus